Liudolf ( – 11/12 March 866) was a Carolingian office bearer and count in the Duchy of Saxony from about 844. The ruling Liudolfing house, also known as the Ottonian dynasty, is named after him; he is its oldest verified member.

Life
Liudolf was the son of a margrave Brun or Brunhart and his wife, Gisla von Verla. Liudolf had extended possessions in the western Harz foothills and on the Leine river, he also served as a military leader (dux) in the wars of the East Frankish king Louis the German against Viking invasions, and the Polabian Slavs. Later authors called Liudolf a Duke of the Eastern Saxons (dux Orientalis Saxonum, probably since 850) and Count of Eastphalia.

About 830 Liudolf married Oda, daughter of a Frankish princeps named Billung and his wife Aeda. By marrying a Frankish nobleman's daughter, Liudolf followed suggestions set forth by Charlemagne about ensuring the integrity of the Carolingian Empire in the aftermath of the Saxon Wars through marriage. Oda died on 17 May 913, supposedly at the age of 107. They had at least seven children:
 Bruno ( – 880), succeeded his father as a Saxon leader, supposed progenitor of the Brunonids
 Oda of Saxony (c. 845 – 874), married to Lothar I, Count of Stade
 Otto the Illustrious ( – 912), succeeded his brother in 880, father of King Henry the Fowler
 Liutgard ( – 885), married the East Frankish ruler Louis the Younger, second son of King Louis the German, in 874.
 Hathumoda ( – 874), first Abbess of Brunshausen from 852
 Gerberga (d. 896/897), Abbess of Brunshausen from 874
 Christina (d. 919/920), Abbess of Gandersheim from 896/97.

In 845/846, Liudolf and his wife went on a pilgrimage to Rome, and upon approval by Pope Sergius II they founded a house of holy canonesses dedicated to Pope Saints Anastasius and Innocent around 852. The monastery, duly established at their proprietary church in Brunshausen, was consecrated by the Hildesheim bishop Altfrid and Liudolf's minor daughter Hathumoda became its first abbess. The convent was relocated in 881 to form Gandersheim Abbey, elevated to an Imperial monastery by Liudolf's grandson Henry the Fowler in 919.

While King Louis the German was preoccupied with Imperial politics, Liudolf, relying on the rank as well as the allodial lands he had inherited from his ancestors, rose to a leading position among the Saxon nobles – made evident by the marriage of his daughter Liutgard with King Louis the Younger. He is buried in his proprietary monastery of Brunshausen. His successions by his sons Bruno and Otto met with no resistance.

References

Sources

Dukes of Saxony
Ottonian dynasty
9th-century births
866 deaths
9th-century rulers in Europe
9th-century Saxon people
Saxon warriors
Year of birth uncertain
Year of death uncertain
German Roman Catholics